Yanis Guermouche (born 15 April 2001) is a professional footballer who plays as a forward for  club Montpellier. Born in France, he is a youth international for Algeria.

Club career
Guermouche signed his first professional contract with Montpellier on 10 June 2021. He made his professional debut with Montpellier in a 2-0 Ligue 1 win over Saint-Étienne on 15 January 2022.

On 18 July 2022, Guermouche was loaned to Châteauroux, a French third-tier Championnat National club. He returned to Montpellier in January 2023.

International career
Born in France, Guermouche is of Algerian descent. He was called up to represent the Algeria U23s at the 2022 Maurice Revello Tournament.

References

External links
 
 Montpellier Profile

2001 births
Living people
Sportspeople from Neuilly-sur-Seine
Algerian footballers
Algeria youth international footballers
French footballers
French sportspeople of Algerian descent
Ligue 1 players
Championnat National players
Championnat National 2 players
Championnat National 3 players
Montpellier HSC players
LB Châteauroux players
Association football forwards
Footballers from Hauts-de-Seine